Pristerognatha fuligana is a moth belonging to the family Tortricidae. The species was first described by Michael Denis and Ignaz Schiffermüller in 1775.

It is native to Eurasia and Northern America.

References

Olethreutinae